Mandaveli is a railway station on the Chennai MRTS. Located across the Venkatakrishna Road at Mandaveli, it exclusively serves the Chennai MRTS.

History
Mandaveli station was opened on 26 January 2004, as part of the second phase of the Chennai MRTS network.

Structure
The station is elevated and is built along the Buckingham Canal, covering both its banks. The station features two side platforms, and each are 280 metres long. The station building consists of 1,900 sq m of parking area in its basement.

Service and connections
Mandaveli station is the ninth station on the MRTS line to Velachery as well as in the return direction from Velachery.

See also
 Chennai MRTS
 Chennai suburban railway
 Chennai Metro
 Transport in Chennai

References

Chennai Mass Rapid Transit System stations
Railway stations in Chennai
Railway stations opened in 2004